The sixth season of The Voice Brasil, premiered on Rede Globo on September 21, 2017, in the 10:30 / 9:30 p.m. (BRT / AMT) slot immediately following the primetime telenovela A Força do Querer.

The show is again hosted by Tiago Leifert, with Mariana Rios serving as backstage host. Lulu Santos, Carlinhos Brown and Michel Teló returned as the coaches, with Ivete Sangalo replacing Claudia Leitte, who took a hiatus after five seasons.

Teams
 Key

Blind auditions
Key

Episode 1 (Sept. 21)

Episode 2 (Sept. 28)

Episode 3 (Oct. 5)

Episode 4 (Oct. 12)

Episode 5 (Oct. 19)

Episode 6 (Oct. 26)

The Playoffs
The Playoffs began on November 2 and comprised episodes 7–9. Distinct from the past five seasons, the season six Playoffs are pre-recorded, thus featuring no interactive viewer component. Divided in twelve groups of four, the top forty eight artists perform for the coaches, with each coach eliminating two artists from their teams from each group. The remaining top twenty four artists advance to The Battles.

The Battles
The Battles round was broadcast on episode 10. The coaches can each steal two losing artists. The top 20 contestants will then move on to The Live Coaches' Battle.
Key

Live shows
The Live shows are the final phase of the competition. It consists of the coaches' battle, two weekly shows and the season finale.

Viewers in the Amazon time zone (Acre, Amazonas, Rondônia and Roraima) are cued to vote to save artists on the show's official website during the delayed broadcast.

Artist's info

Result details

Elimination chart

Week 1

Live Coaches' Battle
In the Live Coaches' Battle round, 4 artists (1 per team) were given a "fast pass" by their coaches, while the remaining 16 competed for  8 spots in the Remix round.

Week 2

Remix

Week 3

Semifinals

Week 4

Finals
This week, the four finalists performed a solo cover song and an original song.

Ratings and reception

Brazilian ratings
All numbers are in points and provided by Kantar Ibope Media.

 In 2017, each point represents 245.700 households in 15 market cities in Brazil (70.500 households in São Paulo only)

References

External links
Official website on Gshow.com

6
2017 Brazilian television seasons